The 1926 Ole Miss Rebels football team was an American football team that represented the University of Mississippi in the Southern Conference during the 1926 college football season. In its second season under head coach Homer Hazel, the team compiled a 5–4 record (2–2 against conference opponents).  The team played its home games at Vaught–Hemingway Stadium in Oxford, Mississippi

The team beat Florida and rival Mississippi A&M. Ap Applewhite was on the team.

Schedule

Roster
T Thad Vann, So.

References

Ole Miss
Ole Miss Rebels football seasons
Ole Miss Rebels football